The Île d'Ogoz is an island in the Lake of Gruyère, located in the canton of Fribourg. It has a length of 130 metres and a width of about 70 metres. Its highest point is 688 metres above sea level or 11 metres above lake level (677 m). The distance from the shore is 160 metres. On the island are a ruined castle and a church.

Before the completion of the Rossens Dam, it was a promontory overlooking the valley of the Sarine. It then became an island after the valley was flooded. When the level of the lake is at its lowest, the island becomes a 500-metre-long peninsula accessible to pedestrians.

Politically the island belongs to the municipality of Pont-en-Ogoz in the district of Gruyère.

References
Swisstopo topographic maps

External links
Île d'Ogoz on la-gruyère.ch

Lake islands of Switzerland
Landforms of the canton of Fribourg